M-30 is a state trunkline highway in the U.S. state of Michigan that runs in a north–south direction from the Midland area to West Branch. The highway runs through rural parts of three counties in the Lower Peninsula. The southern end runs along the Michigan Meridian and parallel to the Tittabawassee River. Prior to 1962, M-30's southern terminus was at a junction with M-46 in Merrill.  Since then, the segment south of US Highway 10 (US 10) was returned to local control and decommissioned. In May 2009, M-30 was extended southerly from US 10 to M-20, restoring some of the highway decommissioned in the 1960s to M-30.

Route description
M-30 is a rural, two-lane highway. M-30 follows Meridian Road starting at an intersection with M-20 (Isabella Road) outside of Midland. From this intersection, the highway runs north along the Michigan Meridian through forest lands to a crossing of the Tittabawassee River near Sanford. M-30 passes through the community and crosses the US 10 freeway near the location where the latter crosses a narrow section of Sanford Lake. The road continues north running parallel to the lake along the meridian to a point near Edenville. There, the highway turns westerly along Curtis Road and then back northerly on Midland Road to a crossing of the Tittabawassee and Wixom Lake.

Past the river and lake crossings, M-30 angles to the northeast to return to the Michigan Meridian. The area adjacent to the lake is farm land, but continuing north, the highway returns to the woodlands of the Au Sable State Forest. M-30 intersects M-61 at Wooden Shoe Village near Smallwood Lake. The highway continues to parallel the Tittabawassee River, crossing several of its smaller tributaries, until a point south of the Gladwin–Ogemaw County county line. The trunkline passes through a small unnamed, unincorporated community northwest of Hockaday near Indian and Elk lakes as the road turns to the northeast between the lakes in the area. M-30 crosses the  county line near Edwards and continues northward. The highway turns to the northeast as it approaches West Branch, crossing under Interstate 75 (I-75) without an interchange. M-30 ends at Business Loop I-75/M-55 on the west side of West Branch.

The Michigan Department of Transportation (MDOT) maintains M-30 like all other parts of the state trunkline highway system. As a part of these responsibilities, the department tracks the volume of traffic using its roads in surveys using a metric called average annual daily traffic (AADT). MDOT calculates the traffic level for a segment of roadway for any average day of the year in these surveys. For 2009, the highest traffic levels were observed on the section north of US 10 at 7,579 vehicles per day. The lowest AADT levels were the 2,952 vehicles between the M-61 junction and the Gladwin–Ogemaw county line. The survey did not include the section south of US 10. No segment has been listed as part of the National Highway System, a network of roads important to the nation's economy, defense, and mobility.

History
M-30 was first designated by July 1, 1919. The original routing only ran from Winegars to West Branch. South of Winegars, the roadway is a portion of M-18.  An extension of M-18 in 1928 or 1929 south of Beaverton led to the redesignation and extension of M-30 south through Edenville and Sanford to end at M-46. M-30 was completely paved as the last  of gravel roadway were completed between Sanford and the Midland–Saginaw county line in 1961. The next year, when M-30 was truncated to end at the US 10 freeway in Sanford, the remaining portion south of US 10 was turned over to county control. On May 13, 2009, the Midland County Road Commission (MCRC) and the Michigan Department of Transportation (MDOT) signed a Memorandum of Understanding that transferred control of Meridian Road south of US 10 to M-20. The roadway transferred included a newly constructed bridge over the Tittabawassee River and other segments of roadway rebuilt by the MCRC. On May 20, 2020, the bridge carrying M-30 over Wixom Lake collapsed after two dams on the Tittabawassee River failed, leading to severe flooding. A temporary bridge opened at the site in March 2021; this span will be replaced in the future once the waterway's final configuration is determined.

Major intersections

See also

Notes

References

External links

M-30 at Michigan Highways

M-30 at CanHighways
M-30 at GribbleNation

030
Transportation in Midland County, Michigan
Transportation in Gladwin County, Michigan
Transportation in Ogemaw County, Michigan